Arabis cypria is a flowering plant in the family Brassicaceae, endemic to mountainous areas of Northern Cyprus.

Description
Arabis cypria is a tufted perennial to 25 cm, the basal leaves softly hairy, in dense rosettes, spoon-shaped with wavy or bluntly toothed edges; flowering stems (alongside leafy shoots) carry a few smaller leaves and a lengthening raceme of white-to-pink flowers 12 mm across. Pods straight or curved, 2–4 cm long, often all spreading in one direction. Flowers from Mars to April.

Habitat
On shady limestone rocks at high altitudes.

Distribution
From St Hilarion to Alevkaya, Kantara and the Karpas Peninsula.

"'/:/s]]

References

External links

 
Arabis cypria photos in naturewonders.org

cypria
Endemic flora of Cyprus
Flora of Europe
Plants described in 1914